The Town of Sandgate is a former local government area of Queensland, Australia, located in northern Brisbane adjacent to Moreton Bay.

History
Land in Sandgate became available in 1853, allowing a small seaside settlement to develop. By 1874, coach services connected Sandgate to Brisbane. The railway line from Brisbane to Sandgate opened in 1882.

On 29 April 1880, Sandgate was proclaimed a municipality known as the Borough of Sandgate.

The Local Authorities Act 1902 replaced all Divisions and Boroughs with Towns and Shires, creating the Town of Sandgate on 31 March 1903.

On 1 October 1925, it was amalgamated into the City of Brisbane.

From its first settlement Sandgate relied on inadequate water supplies from tanks and the local lagoons. Many investigations into better water supplies were carried out over the years, but it was not until November, 1921, that Sandgate was connected to the Brisbane water supply system. At the official opening, the Minister for Works, Mr. W. Forgan Smith, described this as "a historic occasion."

Sandgate Town Hall

The original Sandgate Town Hall was designed by Richard Gailey and built in 1882 at Kate Street, Shorncliffe but burned down on 24 May 1910.

Its replacement was built in 1911–1912 at 5 Brighton Street, Sandgate to be closer to the Sandgate railway station and the Sandgate Post Office. After the amalgamation into City of Brisbane, the Sandgate Town Hall was used as a library, School of Arts and a health clinic. Today it is used as meeting rooms available for use by community groups.

The Sandgate Town Hall was listed on the Queensland Heritage Register in 2005.

Mayors
From the inception of the Town Council the elected aldermen chose one of their number to be mayor for the ensuing year. This changed in 1921 when the mayor was elected directly by the voters from a separate list of mayoral candidates. In 1924 the procedure was changed again, and the aldermanic candidate receiving the most votes became mayor. 
 1880–1881: Edward Barton Southerden
 1882-1884: William Deagon
 1885: William John Farmer Cooksley
 1886: Samuel Maxwell
 1887–1888: Hiram Wakefield
 1889: Thomas Lefroy Holmes
 1890: Joseph Darragh
 1891: Walter Barrett
 1892: Roger Hale Sheaffe
 1893: Martin Quinlan
 1894: John Aloysius Hayes
 1895: George Tyrer Lightbody
 1896: Alfred William Field
 1897: Frederick William Ball Mann
 1898-1899: William Henry Bell
 1900: Thomas Lee
 1901: Thomas Strong
 1902: George Staeheli
 1903: John Aloysius Hayes
 1904-1905: William Henry Bell
 1906: John Edward Selves Plumridge
 1907: John Gilpin
 1908: John Lunn
 1909: Albert Henry William Clarkson
 1910-1911: Frank Gowen
 1912: John Gilpin
 1913: Charles Douglas Ferguson
 1914-1915: John Lunn
 1916: Edward E. Quinlan
 1917-1919: William Henry Bowser
 1920-1921a: James John Dalton
 1921b-1923: William Henry Bowser 
 1924-1925: Ernest William Smith

References

External links

 
Former local government areas of Queensland
Sandgate, Queensland
1925 disestablishments in Australia
Populated places disestablished in 1925
Populated places established in 1880
1880 establishments in Australia